Eliza Swenson (also known as Victoria Mazze) is an American actress, producer, singer, and composer. She was born on July 28, 1982 in Quincy, California. She has five siblings and is the youngest of them.  She received a Bachelor of Fine Arts in Music Media and Sound Engineering from Brigham Young University in 2003.

She is known for producing, editing, co-writing, composing, and starring in the 2012 feature film Dorothy and the Witches of Oz. Under the pseudonym Victoria Mazze, Swenson is lead singer of the band The Divine Madness. On July 26, 2015 she married Jason Tibor Farkas. She has no children.

Filmography

Television
 Drake & Josh (1 episode, 2007) as Vilga

Film
 Frankenstein Reborn (2005) as Elizabeth Weatherly
 The Beast of Bray Road (2005) as Tami
 King of the Lost World (2005) as Gloria
 Satanic (2006) as Dalia
 Bram Stoker's Dracula's Curse (2006) as Gracie Johannsen
 Candy Stripers (2006) as Sally
 The 9/11 Commission Report (2006) as Rosalind
 Pocahauntus (2006) as Destiny Moonbeam
 Dragon (2006) as Freyja
 Transmorphers (2007) as General Van Ryberg
 Pineapple (2008) as Crystal
 Chrome Angels (2009) as Layla
 Drop Dead Gorgeous (2010) as Sateya
 Dorothy and the Witches of Oz (2012) as Billie Westbrook
 Legend of the Red Reaper (2012) as The Teller Witch
 The Penny Dreadful Picture Show (2013) as Penny Dreadful
 Alice D (2014) as Krista
 The Lost Girls (2015) as Gracie

Composer
 Exorcism: The Possession of Gail Bowers (2006)
 Bram Stoker's Dracula's Curse (2006)
 The 9/11 Commission Report (2006)
 Dragon (2006)
 Supercroc (2007)
 Transmorphers (2007) as Victoria Mazze
 The Dunwich Horror (2009)
 Dorothy and the Witches of Oz (2012)
 The Penny Dreadful Picture Show (2013) 
 The Lost Girls (2015)

References

External links
 
 As Victoria Mazze at the Internet Movie Database

1982 births
Actresses from California
American film actresses
American women composers
Brigham Young University alumni
Living people
People from Quincy, California